Fu'an Temple is the name of the following temples:
 Checheng Fu'an Temple (車城福安宮) in Pingtung County, Taiwan
 Shengang Fu'an Temple (伸港福安宮) in Changhua County, Taiwan